Oxley is an English surname, originating in Yorkshire, Durham, Northumberland, Tyne and Wear, and Staffordshire. Notable people with the surname include:

 Adam Oxley (born 1992), Australian rules footballer
 Alan Oxley, Australian diplomat
 Albert Oxley (1915–1994), English footballer
 Bernard Oxley (1907–1975), English footballer 
 Bill Oxley (1918–1985), English professional rugby league footballer
 Billy Oxley (1899–1951), English footballer
 Cyril Oxley (born 1905), English footballer
 Dana Oxley (born 1967), American judge
 David Oxley (1920–1985), English actor
 Deborah Oxley, Australian historian
 Dennie Oxley (born 1970), American politician
 Dinah Oxley (1948–2020), English golfer
 George Oxley (died 1820), political figure in colonial Nova Scotia
 Harrison Oxley (1933–2009), English organist
 Henry Oxley (1858–1945), Canadian-born Major League baseball player
 Henry Oxley (politician) (1826–1867), Australian politician
 James Oxley (born 1961), Australian–American mathematician
 James Macdonald Oxley (1855–1907), Canadian lawyer and an author of books for boys
 Jennifer Oxley, American writer and television director
 Jeremy Oxley, Australian musician, guitarist for 1980s band the Sunnyboys
 John Oxley (disambiguation), several people
 Joseph Oxley (–1868), political figure in colonial Nova Scotia
 Joseph W. Oxley (born 1958), American politician 
 Lawrence A. Oxley (1887–1973), American community leader appointed to Roosevelt's "Black Cabinet"
 Melanie Oxley, Australian musician and songwriter
 Mark Oxley (born 1990), English footballer
 Mike Oxley (1944–2016), American politician
 Paul Oxley, English songwriter living in Finland
 Peter Oxley, Australian musician, bass player for The Sunnyboys
 Philip Oxley (born 1965), English cricketer
 Rob Oxley, British political consultant
 Roslyn Oxley, Australian art dealer
 Roy Oxley (1905–1980), British television set designer
 Scott Oxley (born 1976), English professional footballer
 Simon Oxley (born 1969), British graphic designer
 Tanya Oxley (born 1979), Barbadian track and field sprinter
 Thomas Oxley (1805–1886), Straits Settlements administrator
 Tony Oxley (born 1938), British jazz drummer
 Tony Oxley (boxer) (1942–2015), English boxer
 W. Oxley (Essex cricketer), eighteenth century English cricketer
 Walter Oxley (1891–1978), British Army general
 Will Oxley (born 1965), Australian sport sailor
 William Oxley (1939–2020), English poet

See also 
 Rice-Oxley, a surname 

English-language surnames